José Daniel Ponce (born 26 June 1962) is an Argentine former professional footballer who played as a midfielder; he was part of the Estudiantes de La Plata team that won two back-to-back championships in 1982 and 1983.

Career
Ponce was born in Godoy Cruz, Mendoza and was a product of Godoy Cruz youth system, also playing in the first team at the age of 16, making his debut on October 8, 1978. Then he was transferred and promoted to the first team of Estudiantes by coach Carlos Bilardo, when he shared the midfield with Miguel Ángel Russo, Alejandro Sabella and Marcelo Trobbiani. The team won two back-to-back titles and Ponce was called by Bilardo (now national coach) to the national team. His trademark were his precision free kicks, and his skill with the ball, both dribbling and passing, was often decisive in fast-break attack.

In 1983 Ponce was selected to join the Argentina squad for the Copa América 1983. He later took part in the process that led to Argentina's victory in the 1986 World Cup.

After Estudiantes, with a brief step in Atlético Tucumán in 1984, Ponce played for several clubs including Boca Juniors, San Lorenzo, Gimnasia y Tiro, Douglas Haig and Independiente Rivadavia in Argentina, Atlético Junior and Unión Magdalena in Colombia, Nîmes Olympique in France and Coquimbo Unido, Everton and Huachipato in Chile.

During his time at Boca the club won the Recopa Sudamericana and Copa Sudamericana titles in 1989. He made a total of 33 appearances for the club in all competitions, scoring five goals.

In 1995 while as a player in Coquimbo Unido, he was fired from the club after punching a youth team player in the face.

Personal life
His parents were Juan Carlos, a chauffeur, and Marta. He has four younger brothers: Guillermo, Humberto, Juan Carlos and Eduardo. Since he was a child, he was nicknamed Bocha.

After his retirement from professional football, he made his home in Concepción, Chile. Then, he became a naturalized Chilean and involved in the miner market working in the North Zone of Chile. His Colombian wife, Milena, died of a tumor, days after delivering his first son; his two daughters are Chilean nationals. After a career as a coach in which his temper often got the best of him, Ponce has coached youth teams and has a successful sports-related business operation.

Honours
Estudiantes
Primera División Argentina: Metropolitano 1982, Nacional 1983

Boca Juniors
Recopa Sudamericana: 1989
Supercopa Sudamericana: 1989

References

External links
 
 José Daniel Ponce at playmakerstats.com (English version of ceroacero.es)

1962 births
Living people
Sportspeople from Mendoza Province
Argentine footballers
Argentina international footballers
1983 Copa América players
Godoy Cruz Antonio Tomba footballers
Estudiantes de La Plata footballers
Atlético Junior footballers
Atlético Tucumán footballers
Unión Magdalena footballers
Boca Juniors footballers
Nîmes Olympique players
San Lorenzo de Almagro footballers
Gimnasia y Tiro footballers
Club Atlético Douglas Haig players
Independiente Rivadavia footballers
Coquimbo Unido footballers
Everton de Viña del Mar footballers
C.D. Huachipato footballers
Argentine Primera División players
Categoría Primera A players
Ligue 2 players
Primera Nacional players
Chilean Primera División players
Expatriate footballers in Chile
Argentine expatriate sportspeople in Chile
Expatriate footballers in Colombia
Argentine expatriate sportspeople in Colombia
Expatriate footballers in France
Argentine expatriate sportspeople in France
Argentine emigrants to Chile
Argentine expatriate footballers
Association football midfielders
Naturalized citizens of Chile